A nonpresent tense (abbreviated ) is a grammatical tense that distinguishes a verbal action as taking place in times past or future, as opposed to present tense.

The constructed language Ithkuil has such a tense (RTI (Relative Timeline Indicator), degree 5, suffix -lt).

References

Grammatical tenses